Goon is an IDM/techno album by Johnny Hawk under the recording name of Global Goon.  It is his debut album and first release on Rephlex Records.  It was released in 1996.

Track listing 

 "St. Martin" – 3:30
 "Skip Glider" – 2:33
 "The Owl, Pussycat" – 4:32
 "Signpost" – 5:31
 "Pagan Relict" – 4:31
 "Moon Pool" – 3:29
 "Roller" – 2:57
 "Clapping Song" – 4:51
 "Metal Buffalo" – 3:30
 "Der Kipper" – 5:08
 "Chime Time" – 4:08
 "Synchropeet" – 7:28
 "Twiggy" – 5:29

References 

1996 albums
Global Goon albums
Rephlex Records albums